Rock of the Westies is the tenth studio album by English musician Elton John, released on 4 October 1975. The title is a spoonerism on the phrase "West of the Rockies", the album having been recorded at Caribou Ranch in the Rocky Mountains of Colorado.

Released less than five months after his previous album, Captain Fantastic and the Brown Dirt Cowboy, Rock of the Westies repeated that album's then-unprecedented feat of entering the US Billboard 200 chart at number one, and was John's final chart-topping studio album in that country. It was also successful (albeit to a lesser extent) in the artist's home territory of the UK, where it reached No. 5 on the UK Albums Chart. Robert Christgau ranked it as No. 7 on his list of the best albums of 1975.

History
Rock of the Westies contained the US No. 1 (No. 14 UK) single, "Island Girl", which was released prior to the album. John noted at the time in a radio interview that he had wanted to release "Dan Dare (Pilot of the Future)" as the album's first single instead of "Island Girl", because he thought it had more commercial appeal. He was over-ruled, and "Dan Dare" was never released as a single, whilst "Island Girl" became a hit.

The make-up of John's band was different on Rock of the Westies, being without his long-time drummer Nigel Olsson and bassist Dee Murray, both of whom John fired during April 1975. Added in their place were Hookfoot drummer Roger Pope, an old friend who had played on Empty Sky, Tumbleweed Connection and Madman Across the Water, and American bassist Kenny Passarelli, who had previously played with Stephen Stills and was an original member in Joe Walsh's band Barnstorm. Pope had also played in Kiki Dee's touring band. Grammy, Emmy, and Academy Award-nominated James Newton Howard, at the time a virtual unknown, was also brought in as keyboardist, giving him his first major publicity. Also included was another Hookfoot member, Caleb Quaye on guitar and vocals, another old friend from his early DJM session days. Like Pope, Quaye had also played on Empty Sky, Tumbleweed Connection, and John's intervening eponymous release. Retained from the previous line-up were Davey Johnstone and Ray Cooper.

A slower, less up-tempo version of "Hard Luck Story" had already been recorded by Kiki Dee (whom the song was originally written for), and released as a single one year prior to its recording for Rock of the Westies. Along with "Don't Go Breaking My Heart", it is credited to Ann Orson/Carte Blanche (An 'orse an' cart / 'carte blanche') a punning moniker John devised when composing a song (music and lyrics) on his own. The name Ann Orson is also used as the name of a backing vocalist. Labelle performed backing vocals on the opening track, "Medley: Yell Help/Wednesday Night/Ugly".

In the US, it was certified gold in October 1975 and platinum in March 1993 by the RIAA.

Outside the US and Canada, this was the last original studio release from John on DJM Records, before forming his own label, The Rocket Record Company.

The song "Street Kids" was featured in the 2008 video game Grand Theft Auto IV.

Track listing
 

 Sides one and two were combined as tracks 1–9 on CD reissues.

Personnel 
Track numbers refer to CD and digital releases of the album.

 Elton John – lead vocals, acoustic piano (all except 8)
 James Newton Howard – harpsichord (1), ELKA Rhapsody string synthesizer (1), ARP synthesizer (1, 3), Hohner clavinet (1, 2), mellotron (3), electric piano (4, 5, 7, 8, 9), synthesizers (4, 5, 9)
 Davey Johnstone – electric guitar (1, 3, 4, 5, 7, 8, 9), backing vocals (2, 3, 4, 6, 8), rhythm guitar (2, 6), voice bag (2), Ovation guitar (3), banjo (3), slide guitar (3, 6), acoustic guitar (4, 5), guitar solo (5)
 Caleb Quaye – electric guitar (1, 2, 4, 5, 7, 8, 9), backing vocals (2, 3, 4, 6, 7, 8), acoustic guitar (3, 4, 5), rhythm guitar (6), lead guitar solo (6)
 Kenny Passarelli – bass guitar, backing vocals (2, 3, 4, 6, 7)
 Roger Pope – drums (1-5, 7–9)
 Ray Cooper – tambourine (1, 3, 5, 6, 9), cowbell (1, 9), congas (1, 3, 6, 7, 8), jawbone (1), marimba (3), castanets (4), bell tree (4), vibraphone (4, 5, 8), shaker (8), wind chimes (8), maracas (9), kettle drums (9)
 Labelle – backing vocals (1)
 Ann Orson – backing vocals (1, 2, 3, 6, 8, 9)
 Kiki Dee – backing vocals (2, 3, 4, 6–9)
 Clive Franks – backing vocals (8)

Production 
 Gus Dudgeon – producer
 Jeff Guercio – engineer
 Mark Guercio – assistant engineer
 Arun Chakraverty – mastering
 John Tobler – liner notes
 Terry O'Neill – album cover photograph
 David Larkham – art direction and design

Chart positions

Weekly charts

Year-end charts

Certifications

References

External links

Elton John albums
1975 albums
Albums produced by Gus Dudgeon
DJM Records albums
MCA Records albums
Albums recorded at Trident Studios